The Silver Koala Bear is a silver coin originating from Australia and produceat the Perth Mint.  While the obverse of the coin always depicts Queen Elizabeth II, the reverse side changes every year, always featuring a koala, a marsupial native to Australia. Silver koalas have higher collectible value than some other bullion coins due to the yearly design change and limited production. The coins are minted yearly in up to five different sizes.

Specifications

† This is the maximum thickness.  Thicknesses are different based upon the yearly design of the reverse side.

History 

In its first year of 2007, only the one-ounce bullion coin was minted.  All other sizes were minted in 2008 except for the  oz, which started to be produced in 2011.  Between 2008 and 2010, the only numismatic or proof coinage minted was the one-ounce with gilded koalas.  As of 2020, bullion coins are currently released in 1kg and 1oz sizes and the numismatic coinage is minted in 5oz and 1oz sizes, with other sizes released occasionally. The coins were .999 fine silver until the 2018 edition, which increased in purity to .9999 silver.  Perth Mint originally had no caps on the amount of one-ounce coins produced, but since 2018, it has been capped to 300,000.

Special editions such as privy marked, colored and gilded are often available.

See also
 Australian Silver Kangaroo (bullion)
 Australian Silver Kookaburra
 Bullion
 Bullion coin
 Inflation hedge
 Platinum Koala
 Silver as an investment

References
 General
 2020 Standard Catalog of World Coins - 1901–2000, 47th Edition, publication date 2019, Krause Publications, 
 2020 Standard Catalog of World Coins - 2001–Date, 14th Edition, publication date 2019, Krause Publications, 

Specific

Bullion coins of Australia
Silver bullion coins